What's Wrong may refer to:

 "What's Wrong" (Dennis Wilson song), a song by Dennis Wilson from the 1977 album Pacific Ocean Blue
 "What's Wrong", a song by FireHouse from their 1995 album 3
 "What's Wrong", a song by PVRIS from their 2017 album All We Know of Heaven, All We Need of Hell